Gerald Edward Bond (5 April 1909 – 27 August 1965) was a South African cricketer who played in one Test in 1938. He was born and died at Cape Town.

Career 
Bond was a right-handed middle- or upper-order batsman and a right-arm medium-pace bowler. He played irregularly for Western Province from 1929–30. His best season was 1936–37 when he scored his only first-class century, a score of 170 for Western Province against Natal which was insufficient to prevent his side losing the match by an innings. In the following game, opening the Western Province bowling against Border, he took four wickets for 17 runs with his medium-pace, the best bowling performance of his career.

Bond's Test career was fleeting. He took two wickets (including Wally Hammond) in Western Province's match against the England team in 1938–39 and scored 13 in each innings. He was then picked for the first Test of a five-match series. When England batted, he was the sixth bowler used and was given only two overs, in which he failed to take a wicket and conceded 16 runs; in the South African innings, the unsuccessful promotion of a nightwatchman meant that he batted at no. 9 instead of no. 3 or no. 4 as he generally did for Western Province, and he was dismissed first ball, one of three first-ball dismissals in the innings. He was not selected for South Africa again and in fact did not play any further first-class cricket either.

References

External links
 

1909 births
1965 deaths
Cricketers from Cape Town
South Africa Test cricketers
South African cricketers
Western Province cricketers